Coney Island is an island in Lough Neagh, Northern Ireland. It lies between the mouths of the River Blackwater and the River Bann in the south-west corner of Lough Neagh. Boat trips to the island are available at weekends from Maghery Country Park or Kinnego Marina. The island is owned by the National Trust and managed on their behalf by Armagh City, Banbridge and Craigavon Borough Council. Coney Island Flat is a rocky outcrop adjacent to the island. Although Samuel Lewis called Coney Island the only island in County Armagh, Armagh's section of Lough Neagh also includes Croaghan Island, as well as the marginal cases of Padian and Derrywarragh Island.

Name
The original Irish name of the island was Inis Dabhaill, "island of the Blackwater", so named because it lies opposite where the river Blackwater enters Lough Neagh. In English it was called Enish Douel and then Sidney's Island. The current name comes from coney, meaning "rabbit".

History

Coney Island has a rich history with long evidence of human occupation. This causeway was breached in the 19th century to allow the passage of barges from the Bann to the Blackwater.

It features a 13th-century Anglo-Norman motte. 

A native settlement flourished there in the later Middle Ages when there was also a small iron industry. Subsequently, the island was refortified with a bank, ditch and an external palisade.

It also has a 16th-century stone tower. The island was one of the O'Neill's major strongholds, but was delivered to Lord Deputy Sir Henry Sydney in 1567, and appears to have continued in use as a fort for a generation at least. At some later point the defences were thoroughly razed. In the 17th and 18th centuries the island was only sporadically occupied. 

In the 1890s, Coney Island was bought by James Alfred Caulfield (1830-1913), 7th Viscount Charlemont, supposedly for £150. He lived in Drumcairne, just outside Stewartstown, and bought the island building a summer house in 1895. In 1946, the island was given to the National Trust by Fred Storey.

References

Islands of County Armagh
National Trust properties in Northern Ireland
Lough Neagh
Lake islands of Northern Ireland